The apple fruitminer (Marmara pomonella) is a moth of the family Gracillariidae. It is known from Canada and the United States (Oregon and Maine).

The larvae feed on Malus species (including Malus pumila and Malus sylvestris) and Pyrus species. They usually mine the twigs of their host plant. The mine is found just under the epidermis of the twigs. On occasion, it may also mine the fruit of Malus species, hence its common name.

References

Gracillariinae
Moths described in 1915